The Shipbuilders is a 1943 British drama film directed by John Baxter and starring Clive Brook, Morland Graham and Nell Ballantyne. The film is set in a Clyde shipyard in the build-up to the Second World War. It was made by British National Films and shot at Elstree Studios. It was based on the 1935 novel of the same name by George Blake.

Cast

Critical reception
TV Guide gave the film two out of four stars, calling it a "Well-made story." while Allmovie noted "a rare film of true merit from prolific British "quota quickie" director John Baxter," concluding that "Actual footage shipbuilders at work give this hastily assembled patriotic exercise a veneer of reality."

References

External links

1943 films
1940s English-language films
Films directed by John Baxter
British drama films
Films set in Glasgow
Films set in London
Films set in the 1930s
British World War II films
Seafaring films
Films shot at British National Studios
British black-and-white films
1943 drama films
1940s British films